Yennehole is a small village near Ajekar in Karkala taluk of Udupi district in India. Yennehole means stream where in elephants were coming to drink water YENNE means ELEPHANT in malabyearei MALABYAREI language. There is a small river running through this village by same name. The village became famous when its native Daya Nayak of the Mumbai Police rose to fame. It houses a temple known as Sri Adhishakthi Temple Yennehole which one of the oldest temples in Udupi and managed by Rajapur Saraswat Brahmin Samaj. 

Villages in Udupi district